Coenonympha orientalis is a small butterfly found in the  Palearctic  that belongs to the browns family. It is found in the Balkans (Albania; Bosnia and Herzegovina, Greece, Montenegro, Serbia).

Taxonomy
Coenonympha orientalis has previously been regarded as a subspecies of Coenonympha gardetta  or of Coenonympha leander. Molecular data indicate differentiation of C. orientalis from both C. gardetta and C. leander.

See also
List of butterflies of Europe

References

External links
lepiforum.de

Satyrinae